Myron F. Diduryk  (July 15, 1938 – April 24, 1970) was an American United States Army Major, who played a key role as an infantry company commander in the Battle of Ia Drang, the first major battle of the Vietnam War. His exploits in that battle were described by Hal Moore in, We Were Soldiers Once and Young. Moore said that Diduryk was, "… the finest battlefield company commander I had ever seen, bar none."  Diduryk was killed in action on his second tour in Vietnam.

Early life and education

Born in Mużyłów, Tarnopol Voivodeship (today Muzhyliv in western Ukraine), in 1938, Diduryk emigrated to the United States with his parents in 1950. His family settled in Somerville, New Jersey. After graduating from St. Peter's Preparatory School in Jersey City, New Jersey, he enrolled at Saint Peter's College in  Jersey City, New Jersey, where he was a member of Company N-8 National Society of Pershing Rifles and earned a Bachelor of Science degree in physics from Saint Peter's and was commissioned as a Regular Army Officer on June 5, 1960.

Career

Diduryk completed Airborne School and Ranger School at Fort Benning, Georgia. He served tours of duty at Fort Benning and in Germany. He was married and the father of two children.

During Myron Diduryk's first tour of duty in Vietnam he served as the company commander of Bravo Company 2nd Battalion, 7th Cavalry Regiment, 1st Cavalry Division (Airmobile). In November 1965 he played a key role in the Battle of the Ia Drang, the first major battle of the Vietnam War. His exploits in that battle are described by General Hal Moore in his best-selling book, We Were Soldiers Once and Young ... in which Moore describes Diduryk as "… the finest battlefield company commander I had ever seen, bar none."

Diduryk was subsequently promoted to Major and returned to Vietnam in October 1969, as the operations officer of the 2nd Battalion, 12th Cavalry, 1st Cavalry Division. On April 24, 1970, his battalion commander ordered his command helicopter to land and check out a North Vietnamese soldier who had been killed by the door gunner. As Major Diduryk emerged from his helicopter, he was fatally shot in the stomach by ambushing North Vietnamese soldiers.

Diduryk is buried at Fort Benning Main Post Cemetery, Georgia. The Ukrainian American Veterans Post 30 in South River, New Jersey was named in his honor. Diduryk's name is listed on Panel 11W, Line 44 of the Vietnam Veteran's Memorial Wall in Washington, DC. There is also a paver stone dedicated in his memory at the New Jersey Vietnam Veterans Memorial in Holmdel, N.J.

Awards and decorations

 Silver Star With Oak Leaf Cluster
 Bronze Star With Oak Leaf Cluster and "V" Device
 Purple Heart 
 Air Medal 23rd Award
  Army Commendation Medal 
  Army of Occupation Medal
  National Defense Service Medal
  Vietnam Service Medal 5 Campaigns
   Vietnam Gallantry Cross with Palm
  Republic of Vietnam Campaign Medal
  Senior Parachute Badge
  Combat Infantryman's Badge
 Ranger Tab

References

External links
Saint Peters College biography
Together We Served biography

1938 births
1970 deaths
People from Tarnopol Voivodeship
Polish emigrants to the United States
Pershing Riflemen
United States Army officers
American military personnel killed in the Vietnam War
Recipients of the Silver Star
Recipients of the Gallantry Cross (Vietnam)
Battle of Ia Drang
United States Army personnel of the Vietnam War